

 is a retired Japanese boxer who is a former WBA bantamweight champion. He is an alumnus of the Kinki University.

Muguruma became interested in boxing at the age of a junior high school student. In high school, he belonged to the rugby club. As Muguruma was a slow runner, he was a substitute player there. He began boxing at Osaka Teiken Boxing Gym after entering the University.

Muguruma turned professional with an amateur record of 2–1 (1 KO), and made his debut with a second-round knockout victory on April 9, 1981. He won the annual Japanese boxing series, All-Japan Rookie King Tournament in the featherweight division in February 1982. He went down a weight division to capture the Japanese super bantamweight title in November 1983, and defended that title seven times in total before returning it.

Muguruma dropped down one more weight class for the scheduled fight against Bernardo Piñango for the WBA bantamweight title. However, as Piñango gave up the title, Muguruma won over Panama's Azael Moran via a fifth-round knockout after flooring him twice, to capture the vacant WBA bantamweight title in Moriguchi, Osaka on March 29, 1987.

In his first defense against Chan Young Park in Moriguchi on May 24 of that year, Muguruma was knocked down from an accidental head butt in the third round. Although Muguruma was given a two-minute rest, he could not recover from the damage until he was stopped in the eleventh round.

In September of the same year, Muguruma was tied on points with Wilfredo Vázquez in the fight for the WBA bantamweight title at the Osaka Prefectural Gymnasium. Muguruma moved back a weight class to fight against Juan José Estrada for the WBA super bantamweight title in Moriguchi in October 1988. However he suffered an eleventh round stoppage with the towel thrown in, after being floored in the fourth and eleventh rounds, and hung up his gloves.
 
Subsequently, he joined Mizuno Corporation. From 2008, he was responsible for the production of the focus mitt.

See also
List of WBA world champions
List of bantamweight boxing champions
List of Japanese boxing world champions
Boxing in Japan

References

Bibliography

External links

|-

World Boxing Association champions
World bantamweight boxing champions
World boxing champions
Sportspeople from Osaka
1961 births
Living people
Japanese male boxers